The Stillaguamish River is a river in the northwestern region of the U.S. state of Washington. It is mainly composed of two forks, the longer North Fork Stillaguamish and the South Fork Stillaguamish. The two forks join near Arlington. The river's watershed drains part of the Cascade Range north of Seattle.

Course

The Stillaguamish River is formed from the confluence of the North and South Forks, both of which rise in the Cascades. Between the North and South forks there is a portion of the Mount Baker-Snoqualmie National Forest called the Boulder River Wilderness.

Collecting many tributary creeks, the river flows south, then west through the foothills along the Skagit-Snohomish county line. Tributaries of the North Fork Stillaguamish River include Boulder River and Deer Creek.

The two forks unite at Arlington in northwestern Snohomish County. The combined stream flows west before it briefly splits again to encircle the town of Silvana.

The Stillaguamish bifurcates at its delta to form Florence Island before entering Puget Sound. Hatt Slough flows southwest and is now the primary distributary of the Stillaguamish waters into Port Susan, having been diverted in the early twentieth century. The Old Stillaguamish River Channel flows northwest towards Florence and then Stanwood on an 8 mile meandering course. Near the Camano Island bridge this channel again splits, forming Leque Island, with the South Pass flowing into Port Susan and the West Pass emptying into the southern end of Skagit Bay.

Natural history
The Stillaguamish River and its tributaries are known for their salmon runs.  Eight salmonid species use the streams for spawning, including Chinook, coho, chum, pink, and sockeye salmon, steelhead trout, sea-run cutthroat, and bull trout.

Hydrology
The river level rises and falls very quickly, with the average north fork flood duration of eight hours. Of the five highest north fork flood levels on record, three have occurred since 2009.

History
Variant names for the Stillaguamish River, according to the USGS, include Tuxpam River, Stoh-luk-whahmpsh River, Stillaquamish River, Steilaguamish River, Stalukahamish River, and other similar spellings.

The 2014 Oso landslide occurred on the North Fork of the Stillaguamish.

See also
List of Washington rivers

References

External links

Snohomish County, Stillaguamish Watershed

Rivers of Washington (state)
Rivers of Snohomish County, Washington
Rivers of Skagit County, Washington